Veselovo is a rural locality (a selo) in Michurinskoye Rural Settlement, Kamyshinsky District, Volgograd Oblast, Russia. The population was 454 as of 2010. There are 5 streets.

Geography 
Veselovo is located on the Volga Upland, on the right bank of the Ilovlya River, 25 km northwest of Kamyshin (the district's administrative centre) by road. Dvoryanskoye is the nearest rural locality.

References 

Rural localities in Kamyshinsky District